Henckel may refer to:

Anthony Jacob Henckel (1668–1728), German theologian who founded the first Lutheran church in North America
Frithjof Henckel (born 1950), German rower
Joachim Friedrich Henckel (1712–1779), Prussian surgeon at Charité hospital in Berlin
Johann Friedrich Henckel (1678–1744), Prussian physician, chemist, metallurgist, and mineralogist
John Henckel, Chief Justice of Jamaica in 1801
Valdemar Henckel (1877–1953), Danish businessman and real estate developer

See also
Henckel-Rennen, a horse race in Germany
Heinkel
Henkel